

History 
Established by the Sri Venkateshwara Education Trust (SVET) that was formed and registered under the Karnataka Govt. Act, SVCN is affiliated to the Rajiv Gandhi University of Health Sciences, Bengaluru. SVCN is also recognized by the Karnataka State Nursing Council, Bengaluru.

References

Nursing schools in India
Colleges in Bangalore
Colleges affiliated to Rajiv Gandhi University of Health Sciences
Educational institutions established in 1982
1982 establishments in Karnataka
Educational institutions established in 2003
2003 establishments in Karnataka
Medical colleges in Karnataka
Women's universities and colleges in Karnataka